Cornelia Pfohl (born 23 July 1971) is a German archer who contested four consecutive Summer Olympic Games from 1992 to 2004. She is a two-time Olympic medalist in the women's team event, winning silver medal in 1996 and bronze medal in 2000. She attracted attention at both the 2000 and 2004 Olympics for competing while pregnant with her first and second child respectively.

Career

Olympic career
1992 and 1996 Summer Olympics
Pfohl made her Olympic debut at the 1992 Summer Olympics in Barcelona, finishing forty-fourth overall in the women's individual event. She was also a member of the German team that finished the women's team competition in tenth place.

At the 1996 Summer Olympics Pfohl reached the final of the women's team event. With Germany leading their opponents South Korea by a single point with nine of the match's twenty-seven arrows left, Pfohl shot into the outermost ring of the target, scoring just one point and allowing South Korea to pull ahead to win their third consecutive team gold medal.

2000 and 2004 Summer Olympics
Pfohl competed in the 2000 Summer Olympics while in the early stages of pregnancy with her daughter Mara. She won her second Olympic medal with bronze in the women's team event, and concluded the women's individual event in twenty-fourth place.

Pfohl's qualification for her fourth Olympic Games in 2004 was unexpected, and caused her to delay her plans to get married. Her participation in Athens came while she was pregnant again, this time at 30 weeks with her second child. She placed eighteenth in the ranking round for the women's individual competition. In the first round of elimination, she faced 47th-ranked Marie-Pier Beaudet of Canada. Pfohl defeated Beaudet, winning 146–128 in the 18-arrow match to advance to the round of 32. In that round, she faced Margarita Galinovskaya of Russia, losing to the 15th-ranked archer 158–156 in the regulation 18 arrows.

References

External links

1971 births
Living people
Olympic archers of Germany
Archers at the 1992 Summer Olympics
Archers at the 1996 Summer Olympics
Archers at the 2000 Summer Olympics
Archers at the 2004 Summer Olympics
Olympic silver medalists for Germany
Olympic bronze medalists for Germany
Olympic medalists in archery
German female archers
Medalists at the 2000 Summer Olympics
Medalists at the 1996 Summer Olympics